Protambulyx sulphurea is a species of moth of the  family Sphingidae.

Distribution 
It is known from northern and south-western Venezuela and Bolivia.

Description 
The wingspan is about 110 mm. Adults are similar to Protambulyx ockendeni but the wings are narrower and paler and the pattern is less contrasting. Furthermore, the forewing upperside is lacking the large costal patches and subbasal patch on the inner margin and the marginal band on the forewing underside is much narrower. The hindwing upperside is lemon yellow.

Biology 
Adults are probably on wing year round.

References

Protambulyx
Moths described in 1903